Duchess Amalie Maria in Bavaria (Full German name: Amalie Maria, Herzogin in Bayern) (24 December 1865 – 26 May 1912) was born in Munich, Kingdom of Bavaria, the only child of Duke Karl-Theodor in Bavaria and his first wife Princess Sophie of Saxony. Amalie was a member of the House of Wittelsbach and a Duchess in Bavaria by birth. She was a member of the House of Württemberg, Duchess of Urach and Countess of Württemberg through her marriage to Wilhelm, 2nd Duke of Urach, the future King-elect of Lithuania. She was called by the French version of her name, Amélie, and was lifelong friends with her cousin, Archduchess Marie Valerie of Austria.

Marriage and issue
Amalie married Wilhelm, 2nd Duke of Urach (later Mindaugas II of Lithuania), eldest son of Wilhelm, 1st Duke of Urach and his second wife Princess Florestine of Monaco, on 4 July 1892 in Tegernsee, Kingdom of Bavaria. Amalie and Wilhelm had nine children:

 Princess Marie Gabriele of Urach (1893–1908)
 Princess Elisabeth of Urach (1894–1962) who married Prince Karl Aloys of Liechtenstein (1878–1955), an uncle of Franz Joseph II of Liechtenstein, and had issue.
 Princess Karola of Urach (1896–1980)
 Prince Wilhelm of Urach (1897–1957), who morganatically married Elisabeth Theurer (1899–1988) and had two daughters, Elisabeth and Marie Christine, neither of whom married.
 Karl Gero, Duke of Urach (1899–1981), 3rd Duke, who married Countess Gabriele of Waldburg of Zeil and Trauchburg (1910–2005). No issue.
 Princess Margarete of Urach (1901–1975)
 Prince Albrecht of Urach (1903–1969). First marriage to Rosemary Blackadder, and second to Ute Waldschmidt. He divorced both of them and had children by both. His daughter Marie-Gabrielle (aka Mariga) was the first wife of Desmond Guinness. A diplomat and artist turned journalist and expert on the Far East. His marriages were also considered morganatic but his descendants can claim titles that pass in the eldest female line.
 Prince Eberhard of Urach (1907–1969), who married Princess Iniga of Thurn and Taxis (1925–2008) and had issue; including Karl Anselm and Wilhelm Albert the current and 5th Duke of Urach. While a notional pretender to the crown of Lithuania, he has not made a formal public claim. Eberhard's descendants inherit the dukedom on the basis of the Salic law principle of Agnatic primogeniture
 Princess Mechtilde of Urach (1912–2001), who married Friedrich Karl, Prince of Hohenlohe-Waldenburg-Schillingsfürst and had issue.

Amalie died at Stuttgart, Kingdom of Württemberg, in 1912, aged 46, following the birth of her ninth child.

Ancestry

References

1865 births
1912 deaths
Nobility from Munich
House of Wittelsbach
Duchesses in Bavaria
Duchesses of Urach
Countesses of Württemberg